Love for Sale is the second and final collaborative album by American singers Tony Bennett and Lady Gaga, released on September 30, 2021, by Columbia and Interscope Records. It is the sixty-first and final studio album of Bennett's career, and Gaga's seventh. Following Cheek to Cheek (2014), the  duo's first collaborative album, Love for Sale was recorded between 2018 and early 2020, consisting of their renditions of various jazz standards by American composer Cole Porter, to whom the record is a tribute.

Upon release, Love for Sale received generally favorable reviews from music critics, most of whom highlighted the vocal chemistry between Bennett and Gaga. The album charted inside the top 10 of albums charts in various countries. On the US Billboard 200, it debuted at number 8 as the duo's second top-10 entry, and garnered Bennett the individual record for the longest span of top-10 albums for any living artist; his first top-10 record was I Left My Heart in San Francisco in 1962. Bennett also broke the Guinness World Record for the oldest person to release an album of new material, at the age of 95 years and 60 days. The album won Best Traditional Pop Vocal Album and Best Engineered Album, Non-Classical, and was nominated for Album of the Year at the 64th Annual Grammy Awards, while the track "I Get a Kick Out of You" was nominated for Record of the Year, Best Pop Duo/Group Performance and Best Music Video.

The album was preceded by the release of two singles: "I Get a Kick Out of You" and the title track. The duo gave a recorded performance at Radio City Music Hall on August 3 and 5, 2021, called One Last Time: An Evening with Tony Bennett and Lady Gaga, before Bennett retired from performing live. The special received four nominations at the 74th Primetime Emmy Awards. The album's promotion also include the duo's appearance on MTV Unplugged, and solo performances by Gaga, such as her Jazz & Piano residency show and at the 64th Annual Grammy Awards.

Background 

Tony Bennett and Lady Gaga first met in 2011 at the Robin Hood Foundation gala in New York City. After that, Bennett asked Gaga to sing a duet with him on his album Duets II, so they recorded the song "The Lady Is a Tramp". The next year, he confirmed to Rolling Stone that Gaga wanted to record a jazz album with him. The recording happened between June 2013 and early 2014. Cheek to Cheek was released in September 2014 and debuted atop on the US Billboard 200, with 131,000 copies sold in its first week. It received generally positive reviews, winning a Grammy Award for Best Traditional Pop Vocal Album at the 57th Annual Grammy Awards. Bennett told Billboard that they were inspired by Porter's 1936 musical, Red, Hot and Blue, for a possible sequel to Cheek to Cheek. He also said: "we're gonna do two albums in a row with her [Gaga]. We'll have to try and do that as soon as possible, just as a follow-up for a second album." Upon the announcement of Love for Sale, on August 3, 2021, Gaga commented on Twitter:

In 2016, Bennett was diagnosed with Alzheimer's disease, which resulted in him being a "considerably more muted presence during the recording of the new album", which was later announced to be his final one. In an article at The Wall Street Journal, Marc Myers wrote that "Bennett appears a bit detached when he isn’t singing" in behind-the-scenes videos of the album, but Gaga explained, "as soon as the music started, Tony knew exactly where he was".

Development and composition 

The recording and finalizing of Love for Sale saw numerous delays due to Gaga's other projects – such as the movie A Star Is Born (2018) and solo albums Joanne (2016) and Chromatica (2020) – and the COVID-19 pandemic. Recording sessions took place at Electric Lady Studios in New York, between 2018 and early 2020. All songs on the album are written by Cole Porter, to whom the record is a tribute. The Arts Desk Sebastian Scotney felt that Love for Sale is "a calmer, less histrionic album than its predecessor", Cheek to Cheek, indicative of how "the Bennett/Gaga partnership has also evolved", and furthermore he found it more cohesive as the "Cole Porter songs bring a unifying thread". After the record was finished, Gaga and Bennett went through all the songs to choose the album title, and decided to name it after the song "Love for Sale", which was Bennett's favorite.

Musically, the songs are based on 1940s and 1950s orchestral jazz. Musical backing comes from small jazz ensembles, an orchestra and a big band. According to Sebastian Scotney, "the arrangements mostly alternate between Basie-ish swing for quartet or small band, and a smoochier vibe with studio orchestra textures in which 'with strings', gloops of swoopy countermelody and reharmonisation are contrasted with flutes or oboes, vibes and piano." Helen Brown of The Independent believed "the lively, old-school acoustic arrangements" give the album a "vintage nightclub" atmosphere. El Hunt from NME noted that "in Gaga's hands, certain lyrics take on a tongue in cheek contemporary meaning".

Songs
The album opens with a rattle of drums and trumpet fanfare, followed by Gaga singing the first verses of "It's De-Lovely" in a slow, full voice. The pace picks up when Bennett joins her with "The night is young" line. After a "downright zippy opening", "Night and Day" "resolves into swell romance." Xylophones and flutes give a soft sound to the pair's duet. The title track starts with Bennett softly singing the lines alone, with the big band arrangement joining him at the chorus. Gaga, in the role of streetwalker, joins him and trills: "Who will buy?". The track brings a "hearty helping of old-school Broadway razzle-dazzle" to the "grim scenario", the "sleazy world of sex work". It also involves a bebop saxophone solo. The first solo track is a melodramatic rendition of "Do I Love You" sang by Gaga, with her "voice soaring one second, sultry and smoky the next." It is followed by a swing song, "I've Got You Under My Skin". Gaga, who has a tattoo of a sketch that Bennett made of Miles Davis' trumpet on her arm, made a slight change to the lyrics, singing "like a tattoo under my skin", to which Bennett responds with delighted laughter.

The "fluttering" "I Concentrate on You" is followed by the duo's "campy" take on "I Get a Kick Out of You", which starts with a "jaunty piano", and Gaga slowly singing the first lines. Bennett then picks up with "The only exception I know is the case..." line, and when he says “Then, I see your fabulous face", Gaga jokingly asks Bennett, "Are you talking about me?" The big band arrangement then commances, and accompanies the two for the rest of the song. Bennett "sounds genuinely desperate with devotion" in his solo rendition of "So in Love", while in her solo number of "Let's Do It", Gaga "goes full musical theatre, humming appreciatively as trumpeter Brian Newman lets rip with a solo." After "Dream Dancing", a "swansong to [the duo's] partnership", Bennett sings alone again in "Just One of Those Things", a "nimble swing number" with a hot-club guitar solo. The duo is "playfully bouncing back and forth in the cheeky 'You're the Top'," the final song of the album.

Release 
Love for Sale was released on cassette format on September 30, 2021, with other formats following on October 1. The standard editions of the album contain ten songs, while the digital editions, the Target exclusive editions, and the international deluxe editions contain two additional songs, "I've Got You Under My Skin" and "You're the Top". The international deluxe CD includes two poster fold booklets, photos, and a bonus live album, Cheek to Cheek Live!, containing songs from the television special of the same name. Cassettes were released with differing artworks in pale pink and grey colors; apricot copies were sold exclusively in the United Kingdom. Besides the normal black iteration, the standard edition's vinyl records were also released in yellow color, an Amazon-exclusive cream color, and on 12" picture disc. The deluxe edition's vinyl is available as part of an international double vinyl box set, which also includes the duo's previous collaborative album, Cheek to Cheek, along with a turntable slipmat and a vinyl cleaning cloth, both with pictures of Bennett and Gaga printed on them. A limited edition collectible box set comprises the Love for Sale standard vinyl, a custom embossed sketchbook featuring sketches by Tony Bennett, a pencil/sharpener set, photos, lithographs, watercolor prints, concert poster reprints and a re-printed letter. With the release of Love for Sale, Bennett broke a Guinness World Records title for being the oldest person to release an album of new material at the age of 95 years and 60 days.

Artworks 
The album cover artwork of the standard and digital editions include a photo of Bennett holding a sketchbook that depicts a profile sketch of Gaga, while Gaga is leaning down fixing Bennett's bowtie. People who pre-ordered the album in any format from Lady Gaga's online store had a chance to win the cover art signed by Gaga and Bennett. The Target versions of the CD and vinyl feature an alternative artwork, showcasing Gaga wearing a black gown, with Bennett standing next to her in tuxedo, holding her arm. On September 14, they announced four limited alternate covers available in CD format.

Promotion 
Due to his health condition, Bennett was unable to participate in promotional interviews. On September 30, 2021, Gaga appeared solo on Apple Music's "First Listen" streaming event, where she discussed the making of Love for Sale with Zane Lowe, answered questions from fans and played songs from the album shortly before its release. In that same month, she released the Love for Sale Eyeshadow Palette through her makeup brand, Haus Laboratories, which was inspired by the creation of the album.

Singles and videos 

"I Get a Kick Out of You" was released as the first single from the album on August 3, to digital retailers, and its accompanying music video premiered on MTV on August 6. Its second single, the title track, was released on September 17, while the video premiered the following day, also on MTV. On the album's debut day, they released three different music videos: "I Concentrate on You", "I've Got You Under My Skin", which premiered on MTV, and "Dream Dancing", released exclusively by the Italian radio station Radio Monte Carlo. A video for "Night and Day" premiered on MTV on October 29, 2021. All the released videos were shot at Electric Lady Studios during recording sessions of each song, with the exception of "I Concentrate On You", which shows the sketch session which resulted in Bennett's drawing appearing on the album cover of Love for Sale standard edition. The music videos had a positive critical reception, with journalists highlighting the duo's visible connection and mutual adoration for each other. 

Two days before the release of Love for Sale, an album trailer video appeared on Gaga's YouTube channel with clips from the studio sessions, including performances of tracks from the album and an interview, in which Gaga and Bennett talk about working together, their friendship, and keeping jazz and the Great American Songbook alive for future generations.

Live performances and specials 

Bennett and Gaga presented a pair of shows at Radio City Music Hall, on August 3 and 5, 2021, called One Last Time: An Evening with Tony Bennett and Lady Gaga. They were Bennett's final public performances, as shortly after he retired from performing live on "doctors' orders". Music journalists complimented the vocal skills of both performers, and called the shows "emotional" and "miraculous". An hour-long special of the same name, which is the filmed rendering of the two concerts, simultaneously premiered on CBS and Paramount+ on November 28, 2021. It consisted of select duets and solo performances, including Love for Sale "Let's Do It" and the title track. The special received four nominations at the 74th Primetime Emmy Awards. The duo's final televised performance together was on December 16, 2021, in MTV Unplugged. It was filmed the previous July in front of an intimate studio audience in New York City, and included duets of "Night and Day", "I've Got You Under My Skin", and "Love for Sale".

To celebrate the release of Love for Sale, Gaga teamed up with Westfield for a live-streamed concert experience on September 30, 2021, through their virtual platform or within physical Fan Zones in 21 Westfield centres across the United States and Europe. Her set included "Night and Day", "Let's Do It" and the title track of the album, among other jazz standards and her own songs. On October 14, 2021, she continued her Jazz & Piano residency in Las Vegas after a long hiatus due to the COVID-19 pandemic, and updated the setlist with songs from Love for Sale ("Let's Do It", "Do I Love You", "You're the Top" and the title track). On April 3, 2022, Gaga gave a performance of "Do I Love You" and the title track at the 64th Annual Grammy Awards, while videos of her and Bennett recording in the studio played behind her. The gig was described as a "gloriously theatrical and somehow-also-touching tribute to her ailing duet partner Tony Bennett" in The New York Times.

Critical reception 

Love for Sale was met with generally positive reviews. At Metacritic, which assigns a normalized rating out of 100 to reviews from professional critics, Love for Sale received a weighted average score of 70, based on 11 reviews.

In the Rolling Stone review for the album, Joe Gross calls Bennett and Gaga's collaboration "a superhero team-up that has produced another album of rock-solid takes on the American songbook". Writing for The Independent, Helen Brown also praises Love for Sale versions of Cole Porter's songs, stating that while Porter's songwriting "is sometimes criticised for a lack of emotional depth [Bennett and Gaga] dance through his witty wordplay and bring nuanced humanity" and that the duo "ha[s] a chemistry that crackles against the odds". Austin Saalman of Under the Radar called it "one of the finest jazz releases in a long while", which is "a treat for those interested in listening to two greats who, while existing generations apart, possess the same authoritative grasp as both recording and performance artists." Cragg Michael of The Observer found Love for Sale  "ebullient" and "immaculately produced", which "feels like a fond farewell rather than a solemn goodbye" to Bennett's career. Ross Horton of The Line of Best Fit thought that the album was "rather charming", and said: "This is neither an essential nor an endlessly replayable record - but what it is, thankfully, is a delightful entry point to the works of Tony Bennett."

Writing for The Guardian, Alexis Petridis described the album as "being infectiously good fun". Petridis praised Gaga's "authentic" performances, while also noting that Gaga "occasionally feels as if she's enjoying herself too much to inject the requisite pathos into a song" and that the singer is better served for "lighter, more uptempo love songs". Stephen Thomas Erlewine of AllMusic thought that the album was "light and sweet", where "Gaga sings with total awareness of the audience, hitting her marks with a sense of flair, while Bennett is pleasing the crowd with casual charm." He appreciated this dynamic "that gives the album a pulse and helps distract from the slight air of televised variety shows that permeate the record." Similarly, El Hunt stated in a review for NME that the finest moments of the album are when the two artists "playfully trade lines and sing in unison, with the veteran singer countering his collaborator’s belting vocal with artful restraint".

Some critics noted that Bennett's age and health has impacted his vocals. Hunt said his voice "has become rougher and raspier with age", while music journalist Neil McCormick described it as "so thin it has become almost translucent" in a review for The Daily Telegraph. Petridis calls Bennett's performance "pretty remarkable" despite the singer's age and health condition in his review for The Guardian. David Smyth of the Evening Standard found his voice "husky but strong". Mary Siroky of Consequence thought that Gaga "does quite a bit of heavy lifting on Love for Sale, but Bennett’s vocals remain crystal clear", and opined that the record works the best "when the two are together." Eric Handerson from Slant Magazine slammed the album, and criticized Gaga for her vocal skills as a jazz singer and for "dragging Tony Bennett, who was diagnosed with Alzheimer's disease in 2016, into the studio for another go at the brassy ring."

By contrast, then-80-year-old critic Robert Christgau admitted that he had "failed to register" not only that "all 12 titles are by pantheon wit-and-a-half Cole Porter", but also that "Alzheimer's has been found to be much easier on your verbal memory if you are singing, at which point lyrics you could once recite verbatim pour past your vocal chords and into the air as if they were notes on a scale, as they also are." Christgau added in conclusion that Bennett has retained "a larynx worthy of the name, which not every singer of 75 much less 95 can claim", and "sounds leaner, a bit drier, but also capable of enunciating every word in a long-cultivated New York accent whose miraculous juice and intuitive smarts could make an 80-year-old hope for a longer life than many would consider seemly."

Accolades 
Love for Sale was nominated for Album of the Year, and won for Best Engineered Album, Non-Classical and Best Traditional Pop Vocal Album at the 64th Annual Grammy Awards. While its lead single, "I Get a Kick Out of You", was nominated for Record of the Year, Best Pop Duo/Group Performance and Best Music Video. With the nominations, Bennett made history as the oldest artist ever nominated in a general field category, and the second oldest nominee overall—Pinetop Perkins, at the age of 97, won the Grammy Award for Best Traditional Blues Album for his album Joined at the Hip (2010).

Commercial performance 
In the United States, Love for Sale landed at number eight on the Billboard 200 as the pair's second consecutive top-ten project in the country, following Cheek to Cheek, which debuted atop the chart in 2014. Individually, Love for Sale scored Gaga's tenth top-ten record on the Billboard 200, and the sixth of Bennett's career, with which, he marked the longest span of top-ten albums for any living artist, having earned his first one 59 years ago with I Left My Heart in San Francisco (1962). However, the album marks Gaga's first studio album since The Fame (2008) to miss number 1 in the US. Love for Sale opened with 41,000 album-equivalent units, consisting of 38,000 sales, and 3,000 streaming units calculated from the 3.85 million on-demand streams the album received in its first week.

Track listing 
All songs from Love for Sale are written by Cole Porter and produced by Dae Bennett.

Personnel 
Musicians

 Tony Bennett – vocals (1–3, 5–8, 10–12)
 Lady Gaga – vocals (1–7, 9, 12)
 Steve Kortyka – alto saxophone (1, 3, 5–7, 9, 11, 12)
 Daniel Foose – bass (1, 6, 9, 12)
 Joe Peri – drums (1, 6, 9, 12)
 Alex Smith – organ, piano (1, 6, 9, 12)
 Brian Newman – trumpet (1, 6, 9, 12)
 Dan Krekeler – bass (2, 4, 8, 10)
 Jeremy McCoy – bass (2, 4, 8, 10)
 Marshall Wood – bass (2–5, 7, 8, 10)
 Peter Donovan – bass (2, 4, 8, 10)
 Timothy Cobb – bass (2, 4, 8, 10)
 William Short – bassoon (2, 4, 8, 10)
 Adele Stein – cello (2, 4, 8, 10)
 Clarice Jensen – cello (2, 4, 8, 10)
 Ellen Westermann – cello (2, 4, 8, 10)
 Julia Bruskin – cello (2, 4, 8, 10)
 Kari Docter – cello (2, 4, 8, 10)
 Peter Sanders – cello (2, 4, 8, 10)
 Jessica Phillips – clarinet (2, 4, 8, 10)
 Elena Barere – concert master (2), violin (2)
 Jorge Calandrelli – conductor (2, 4, 8, 10)
 Harold Jones – drums (2–5, 7)
 Diane Lesser – English horn (2, 4, 8, 10), oboe (2)
 John Romeri – flute (2, 4, 8, 10)
 Keith Bonner – flute (2, 4, 8, 10)
 Eric Reed – French horn (2, 4, 8, 10)
 Julia Pilant – French horn (2, 4, 8, 10)
 Stewart Rose – French horn (2, 4, 8, 10)
 William de Vos – French horn (2, 4, 8, 10)
 Gray Sargent – guitar (2–5, 7)
 Mariko Anraku – harp (2, 4, 8, 10)
 Tom Ranier – musical direction (2–5, 7)
 Erik Charlsto – percussion (2, 4, 8, 10)
 Steven White – percussion (2, 4, 8, 10)
 Jason Haaheim – timpani (2, 4, 8, 10)
 Caleb Burhans – viola (2, 4, 8, 10)
 David Gold – viola (2, 4, 8, 10)
 Desiree Elsevier – viola (2, 4, 8, 10)
 Dov Scheindlin – viola (2, 4, 8, 10)
 Katherine Anderson – viola (2, 4, 8, 10)
 Mary Hamman – viola (2, 4, 8, 10)
 Shmuel Katz – viola (2, 4, 8, 10)
 Todd Low – viola (2, 4, 8, 10)
 Amy Kauffman – violin (2, 4, 8, 10)
 Ann Lehman – violin (2, 4, 8, 10)
 Basia Danilow – violin (2, 4, 8, 10)
 Catherine Sim – violin (2, 4, 8, 10)
 Hae Young Ham – violin (2, 4, 8, 10)
 Jonathan Dinklage – violin (2, 4, 8, 10)
 Julia Ahyoung Choi – violin (2, 4, 8, 10)
 Katherine Fong – violin (2, 4, 8, 10)
 Kristi Helberg – violin (2, 4, 8, 10)
 Laura Frautschi – violin (2, 4, 8, 10)
 Laura McGinniss – violin (2, 4, 8, 10)
 Louise Owen – violin (2, 4, 8, 10)
 Margaret Gould – violin (2, 4, 8, 10)
 Maria Conti – violin (2, 4, 8, 10)
 Matthew Lehman – violin (2, 4, 8, 10)
 Nancy Wu – violin (2, 4, 8, 10)
 Robert Zubrycki – violin (2, 4, 8, 10)
 Sean Carney – violin (2, 4, 8, 10)
 Sylvia Danberg – violin (2, 4, 8, 10)
 Xiao-Dong Wang – violin (2, 4, 8, 10)
 Yurika Mok – violin (2, 4, 8, 10)
 Aaron Heick – alto saxophone (3, 5, 7, 11)
 David Mann – alto saxophone (3, 5, 7, 11)
 Roger Rosenberg – baritone saxophone (3, 5, 7, 11)
 Jeff Nelson – bass trombone (3, 5, 7, 11)
 Marion Evans – concert leader (3, 5, 7, 11)
 Charles Pillow – tenor saxophone (3, 5, 7, 11)
 Marc Phaneuf – tenor saxophone (3, 5, 7, 11)
 Michael Davis – trombone (3, 5, 7, 11)
 Nicholas Grinder – trombone (3, 5, 7, 11)
 Randy Andos – trombone (3, 5, 7, 11)
 Dylan Schwab – trumpet (3, 5, 7, 11)
 Jonathan Owens – trumpet (3, 5, 7, 11)
 Scott Wendholt – trumpet (3, 5, 7, 11)
 Tony Kadleck – trumpet (3, 5, 7, 11)

Technical
 Dae Bennett – production, mixing, engineering
 Greg Calbi – mastering
 Steve Fallone – mastering
 Billy Cumella – recording (1, 6, 9, 12)
 Josh Coleman – recording (2–5, 7, 8, 10, 11)
 Caitlyn Bogard – recording assistance (1, 6, 9, 12)
 Gosha Usov – recording assistance (1, 6, 9, 12)
 Roland Cespedes – recording assistance (2–5, 7, 8, 10, 11)
 Taylor Fuchs – recording assistance (2–5, 7, 8, 10, 11)

Charts

Weekly charts

Year-end charts

Release history

References 

2021 albums
Albums recorded at Electric Lady Studios
Cole Porter tribute albums
Columbia Records albums
Covers albums
Interscope Geffen A&M Records albums
Interscope Records albums
Grammy Award for Best Engineered Album, Non-Classical
Grammy Award for Best Traditional Pop Vocal Album
Lady Gaga albums
Tony Bennett albums
Vocal duet albums